Lakeside Mills Historic District is a national historic district located at Burlington, Alamance County, North Carolina. It encompasses 20 contributing buildings built in the 1890s.  The district includes a one-story brick mill and ancillary buildings, 16 one-, 1 1/2- and two-story frame houses, and a store building.

It was added to the National Register of Historic Places in 1984.

References

Historic districts on the National Register of Historic Places in North Carolina
Buildings and structures in Burlington, North Carolina
National Register of Historic Places in Alamance County, North Carolina